Loch Ard is a loch in Scotland.

Loch Ard may also refer to:

Loch Ard (ship), 19th century clipper ship
Loch Ard Gorge, Port Campbell National Park, Victoria, Australia